Urinary deviation may refer to:
Urinary tract malformation
Surgically created urinary diversion